Senan (also Romanized as Senān and Sanān) is a village in Fedashkuyeh Rural District, Shibkaveh District, Fasa County, Fars Province, Iran. At the 2006 census, its population was 1,854, in 429 families.

References 

Populated places in Fasa County